The Treaty of Nice was a military alliance treaty signed by Italy and France and revealed on September 5, 1892. The consequence of the treaty was that if one the signatories was attacked in an act of war, the other signatory must declare war on the attacker if requested.

Notes

19th-century military alliances
1892 treaties
Treaties of the French Third Republic
Treaties of the Kingdom of Italy (1861–1946)
Military alliances involving France
Military alliances involving Italy
1892 in France
1892 in Italy
September 1892 events